Campti is a town in the northern part of Natchitoches Parish, Louisiana, United States. The population was 1,056 at the 2010 census. It is part of the Natchitoches Micropolitan Statistical Area. Campti is a flat area of mostly farmland. It is located on the eastern bank of the Red River. Considerable herds of cattle are also raised in the general area.

Etymology 
Tradition maintains that the name "Campti" was derived from the name of a Natchitoches Indian chief, known to the French colonists as "Le Roi Campti" (The King Campti). Church records in Natchitoches show that a French missionary, Père Valentin, visited the community of Campti around 1745. This was the first written record of Campti during the period of French Louisiana.

History 
The rural parish was developed for large cotton plantations, and a majority of the population were enslaved African Americans in the antebellum years. But by the time of the American Civil War, a number of free people of color also lived in Campti and the area. They were known to be related to several of the longtime white families, who acknowledged them, and they were generally well accepted. According to one authority on this area, they lived nearly as white. At least nine men of color, and likely more, enlisted in the Confederate Army during the Civil War and "easily entered a predominately white military company."

During the war, Union Brigadier-General A. J. Smith, with two brigades, reached Campti to assist Rear-Admiral David D. Porter's gunboats on the Red River there. Confederate Brigadier-General St. John R. Liddell's scattered troops had been harassing the Union fleet but quickly retreated as Smith's overwhelming force arrived on April 13, 1864. Smith and his men burned what was left of Campti, on April 14, 1864. The gunboats were returned safely upriver to Grand Ecore in Natchitoches Parish.

In the postwar years, cotton and agriculture continued as mainstays of the economy. Later cattle raising was introduced. Large-scale agriculture and ranching have reduced economic opportunities in the rural area. The population of Campti has continued to be majority African American, reflecting the history of its development.

Geography
Campti is located at  (31.895511, -93.113966).

Demographics

2020 census

As of the 2020 United States census, there were 887 people, 427 households, and 192 families residing in the town.

2000 census
As of the census of 2000, there were 1,057 people, 385 households, and 269 families residing in the town. The racial makeup of the town was 24.88% White, 74.46% African American, 0.09% Native American, 0.28% from other races, and 0.28% from two or more races. Hispanic or Latino of any race were 0.85% of the population.

There were 385 households, out of which 42.9% had children under the age of 18 living with them, 30.4% were married couples living together, 35.3% had a female householder with no husband present, and 29.9% were non-families. 26.0% of all households were made up of individuals, and 6.2% had someone living alone who was 65 years of age or older. The average household size was 2.74 and the average family size was 3.36.

In the town, the population was spread out, with 38.5% under the age of 18, 8.5% from 18 to 24, 25.8% from 25 to 44, 18.0% from 45 to 64, and 9.2% who were 65 years of age or older. The median age was 27 years. For every 100 females, there were 81.9 males. For every 100 females age 18 and over, there were 75.2 males.

The median income for a household in the town was $14,844, and the median income for a family was $15,781. Males had a median income of $25,750 versus $14,000 for females. The per capita income for the town was $7,219. About 47.3% of families and 45.4% of the population were below the poverty line, including 55.9% of those under age 18 and 33.0% of those age 65 or over.

In 2010, Campti had the eighth-lowest median household income of all places in the United States with a population over 1,000. The town of Campti is 75 percent African American in population.

Education
Natchitoches Parish School Board operates public schools, including Fairview Alpha Elementary School and Lakeview Junior-Senior High School.

Natchitoches Parish Library operates the Northeast Branch in Campti.

Notable people
 Maxine Brown Russell, country singer, was born in Campti. She is a Country Music Hall of Fame inductee and performed with her siblings, Jim Ed and Bonnie, as The Browns.

See also

References

Towns in Louisiana
Towns in Natchitoches Parish, Louisiana